Perophoridae is a sea squirts family in the suborder Phlebobranchia.

References

External links 

Enterogona
Tunicate families